Unit:187 is a Canadian industrial band, started by John Morgan and Tod Law in 1994.

History
Unit:187 (also known as Unit 187) was formed in Vancouver, British Columbia. Vancouver industrial scene influences such as Front Line Assembly and Skinny Puppy helped guide the band to write their first self-titled studio album which was released by 21st Circuitry in 1995. In 1998, the band's second album Loaded, produced by Devin Townsend gained critical acclaim with several of the songs becoming international favorites on the industrial music charts. In 1999, 21st Circuitry Records collapsed, and left the band to find a new home for their music.v In 2001, 187 released Capital Punishment on their new label, COP International. Mixes by Ken 'Hiwatt' Marshall and Anthony Valcic made the album stand out as the band's best to date and cemented their unique deep electronic sound as something apart from the ordinary, according to critics.

Unit:187 released their fourth studio album, Out for Blood, at the end of October 2010 with producer Chris Peterson.

In 2012, Unit:187 and Vendetta Music released the "Out for Blood" Remix album Transfusion featuring remixes from bands including Stiff Valentine, 16Volt, Mindless Faith and iVardensphere.

On June 22, 2015, Unit:187 announced on its Facebook page that Tod Law had died as a result of leukemia. He was survived by his wife Terri 'Sat Beant' Bishop, daughter Arianna, and son Angus.

Discography
Studio albums
 Unit:187 (1996)
 Loaded (1997)
 Capital Punishment (2001)
 Out for Blood (2010)

Remix albums
 Transfusion (2012)

EPs
 Stillborn (1997)

References

External links
 
 
 
 
 

Musical groups established in 1994
Musical groups disestablished in 2015
Musical groups from Vancouver
Canadian industrial music groups
Off Beat label artists
1994 establishments in British Columbia
2015 disestablishments in British Columbia
21st Circuitry artists